Aegeofusinus eviae is a species of sea snail, a marine gastropod mollusk in the family Fasciolariidae, the spindle snails, the tulip snails and their allies.

Description

Distribution

References

 Buzzurro G. & Russo P. (2007). Fusinus del Mediterraneo. published by the authors, 280 p. page(s): 89-90, 248-249
 Russo P. (2017). New genus Aegeofusinus (Gastropoda: Fasciolariidae) to include small endemic species of the Aegean sea. Bollettino Malacologico. 53: 63-68.

eviae
Gastropods described in 2007